The Grand Prix C.F. Ramuz is a literary award presented every five years by the Foundation C.F. Ramuz to honour a writer's entire work. It has been awarded from 1955 until 2005.
The foundation's stated goals are to:
maintain the memory of Charles Ferdinand Ramuz, and keep his works alive.
support the diffusion and the republication of the works of the writer.
support critical translations and work, particularly through conferences.
help with the creation of spectacles drawn from Ramuz's work.
encourage French literary creation and Swiss writers of the French language

The foundation also presents a tri-annual Poetry Prize, the 'Prix de poésie'.

Laureates of the great prize 
The following have received the award:
1955: Pierre-Louis Matthey (1893-1970)
1960: Charles-François Landry (1909-1973)
1965: Marcel Raymond (1897-1981)
1970: Philippe Jaccottet (born 1925)
1975: Jacques Mercanton (1910-1996)
1980: Alice Rivaz (1901-1998)
1985: Georges Haldas (1917-2010)
1990: Yves Velan (1925-2017)
1995: Nicolas Bouvier (1929-1998)
2000: Anne-Lise Grobéty (1949-2010)
2005: Pierre Chappuis  (born 1930)
2010: Jean-Luc Benoziglio  (1941-2013)
2015: Catherine Safonoff  (born 1939)
2020: Philippe Rahmy

Laureates of the poetry prize 
1983: José-Flore Tappy, for Errer mortelle
1986: Sylviane Dupuis, for Creuser la nuit
1992: Alain Rochat, for Fuir pour être celui qui ne fuit pas
1999: Claire Genoux, for Saisons du corps
2002: Caroline Schumacher, for Les Grandes Vacances
2007: Mary-Laure Zoss, for Le noir du ciel
2013: Claudine Gaetzi, for Rien qui se dise
2016: Pierrine Poget, for Fondations

References 

Swiss literary awards
Awards established in 1955
1955 establishments in Switzerland